Vital'O FC is a professional football club based in Bujumbura, Burundi. The team currently plays in the Burundi Ligue A, the top division of Burundi football.

History 
They were founded as Gwanda, Sport FC in the 1960s, changed their name to ALTECO in 1971, to Tout Puissant Bata in 1973, 
then merged with Rapid to become Espoir soon after and finally became Vital'ô around 1975.

Burundi Premier League: 20
 1971, 1979, 1980, 1981, 1983, 1984, 1986, 1990, 1994, 1996, 1998, 1999, 2000, 2006, 2007, 2009, 2010, 2011–12, 2014–15, 2015–16.

Burundian Cup: 14
 1982, 1985, 1986, 1988, 1989, 1991, 1993, 1994, 1995, 1996, 1997, 1999, 2015, 2018.

Burundi Super Cup: 0

 Finalist in the African Cup Winners' Cup in 1992 (defeated by Africa Sports of Ivory Coast)

Kagame Interclub Cup: 3 appearances
 2013 – Winner

Current team

Performance in CAF competitions
CAF Champions League: 8 appearances

1999 – Second Round
2000 – Second Round
2001 – First Round

2007 – Preliminary Round
2008 – Preliminary Round
2010 – Preliminary Round

2011 – Preliminary Round
2013 –

CAF Confederation Cup: 1 appearance
2009 – Preliminary Round

 African Cup of Champions Clubs: 5 appearances

1982 – First Round
1984 – First Round

1985 – Quarter-finals
1991 – Second Round

1993 – First Round

CAF Cup: 1 appearance
1996 – Preliminary Round

CAF Cup Winners' Cup: 9 appearances

1983 – First Round
1986 – First Round
1983 – Quarter-finals

1989 – First Round
1990 – Quarter-finals
1992 – Finalist

1995 – Second Round
1996 – First Round
1998 – withdrew in First Round

References

External links
Soccerway

1960s establishments in Burundi
Football clubs in Burundi